Oscar Terán (Panama July 22, 1868 – 1936) was a Panamanian lawyer that served in the Senate of Colombia when Panama was still part of Colombia.

He wrote the following books:
Relación de viaje: Tierra Santa y los paises que bañan el Mediterreaneo oriental (1924-1925)
Escritos y Discursos y Del Tratado Herrán-Hay al Tratado Hay-Bunau Varilla (1936)

References 

1868 births
1936 deaths
20th-century Panamanian lawyers